Ṡ (lowercase: ṡ or ẛ) is a letter of the extended Latin alphabet, formed by S with the addition of a dot above.

In Irish orthography, the dot was used only for ẛ and ṡ, while a following h was used for ch ph th; lenition of other letters was not indicated. Later the two systems spread to the entire set of lenitable consonants and competed with each other. Eventually the standard practice was to use the dot when writing in Gaelic script and the following h when writing in antiqua. Thus ċ and ch represent the same phonetic element in Modern Irish.

Usage in various languages

Emilian 
Ṡ is used in Emilian to represent [z],

e.g. faṡû [faˈzuː] "beans" (Bolognese dialect).

References
 Cite dot Phonetic Symbol Guide S dot, Irish.

Latin letters with diacritics
Phonetic transcription symbols